Orthozona is a genus of moths of the family Erebidae.

Species
Orthozona bilineata  Wileman, 1915 
Orthozona curvilineata  Wileman, 1915 
Orthozona karapina  Strand, 1920 
Orthozona quadrilineata (Moore, 1882)  (from India/Darjeeling)
Orthozona rufilineata  (Hampson, 1895)

References

Smetacek & Kitching, 2012. The hitherto undescribed male of Orthozona quadrilineata (Moore, 1882) (Lepidoptera: Erebidae). Journal of Threatened Taxa 4 (14): 3366–3368
Natural History Museum Lepidoptera genus database

Herminiinae
Moth genera